Ilya Yamkin (born February 17, 1994) is a Russian professional ice hockey player. He is currently playing with Torpedo Nizhny Novgorod of the Kontinental Hockey League (KHL).

On September 12, 2013, Yamkin made his Kontinental Hockey League debut playing with Torpedo Nizhny Novgorod during the 2013–14 KHL season.

References

External links

1994 births
Living people
Russian ice hockey forwards
Torpedo Nizhny Novgorod players
Sportspeople from Nizhny Novgorod